Gökmen Özdenak (born 22 June 1947) is a Turkish former footballer who played as a striker. He is best known for his stint with Galatasaray, and is known by his nickname Ayı Gökmen (English, "Gökmen the Bear"). He represented the Turkey national football team.

Professional career
Özdenak begun his footballing career with İstanbulspor in the Turkish Süper Lig. Two years later, he transferred to Galatasaray and helped them win 4 Süper Lig titles as he played there for 13 years.

Outside football
After his footballing career, Özdenak begun commentating football with former footballer Ziya Şengül.

Personal life
Özdenak was born into a sporting family, as his brothers Yasin and Doğan were also professional footballers.

Honours
Galatasaray
TSYD Cup (3): 1968-69, 1970-1971, 1977-1978
Turkish Super Cup (2): 1968-69, 1971-72
Süper Lig (4): 1968-69, 1970-71, 1971-72, 1972-73
Turkish Cup (2): 1972–73, 1975–76
Prime Minister's Cup (2): 1974–1975, 1978–1979

References

External links
 
 

1947 births
Living people
Footballers from Istanbul
Turkish footballers
Turkey international footballers
Turkey youth international footballers
Association football forwards
Galatasaray S.K. footballers
İstanbulspor footballers
Süper Lig players